Lobanikha is a rural locality (a settlement) in Cherdynsky District, Perm Krai, Russia. The population was 55 as of 2010. There is 1 street.

Geography 
Lobanikha is located 12 km north of Cherdyn (the district's administrative centre) by road. Pokcha is the nearest rural locality.

References 

Rural localities in Cherdynsky District